Nungba (Vidhan Sabha constituency) is one of the 60 Vidhan Sabha constituencies in the Indian state of Manipur.

It is part of Tamenglong district and is reserved for candidates belonging to the Scheduled Tribes.

Members of Legislative Assembly 
1972: Kalanlung, Indian National Congress
1974 : Jangamlung, Manipur Hills Union
 1980: Saikhangam, Independent
 1984: Gaikhangam, Indian National Congress
 1990: Gaikhangam, Indian National Congress
 1995: Gangmumei Kamei, Federal Party of Manipur
 2000: Gangmumei Kamei, Federal Party of Manipur
 2002: Gaikhangam, Indian National Congress
 2007: Gaikhangam, Indian National Congress
 2012: Gaikhangam, Indian National Congress

Elections results

2022

2017

See also
Manipur Legislative Assembly
List of constituencies of Manipur Legislative Assembly
Tamenglong district

References

External links
 

Assembly constituencies of Manipur
Tamenglong district